Life Death Time Eternal is the third studio album by Australian hip hop artist Tuka, released through EMI on 10 July 2015.

Acoustic EP
On 18 March 2016, Tuka will release the Alive Death Time Eternal EP, which will contain live and acoustic versions of 6 tracks off the EP.

Tours
On 23 October 2015, Tuka began his first ever headline tour, the Life Death Time Eternal Tour. On 1 April 2016, began the Don't Wait Up Tour.

Awards
The album was nominated for Best Urban Album at the 2015 ARIA Awards.

Track listing

Charts

References

2015 albums
Tuka (rapper) albums
Albums produced by J57
Albums produced by Alex Hope (songwriter)